The Musée Maillol de Banyuls-sur-Mer is a private museum at the farm of the sculptor Aristide Maillol where he spent the last years of his life. The farm, "La Métairie", is situated in the Roume valley 4 km from the city center of Banyuls-sur-Mer in the Pyrénées-Orientales. The museum is operated by the Fondation Dina Vierny, which also operates the Musée Maillol in Paris.

Establishment
After Maillol's death in 1944, the site was abandoned and deteriorated. Much later, thanks to the combined actions of Maillol's model and muse Dina Vierny and the city of Banyuls-sur-Mer, the rescue and restoration of the farm took place. A small Maillol museum was opened to the public at the end of 1994.

Exhibits
The museum presents works of Aristide Maillol as well as artifacts from his daily life in La Métairie. Exhibits include:
 36 bronze and terracotta sculptures
 Lithographs, drawings, paintings, and ceramics
 The dining-room of his studio at Marly-le-Roi and his kitchen
 His workshop
 Temporary exhibitions

In the garden of the museum is his tomb on which sits a bronze cast of La Méditerranée, one of his favorite works.

Gallery

See also
 List of single-artist museums
 Musée Maillol, Paris

References

Banyuls-sur-Mer
Maillol
Maillol
Sculptures in France
Museums devoted to one artist